Creeslough (locally) is a village in County Donegal, Ireland,  south of Dunfanaghy on the N56 road. The small village overlooks an arm of Sheephaven Bay, with the population of the surrounding area engaged mainly in agriculture, mostly livestock rearing.

Name
According to the Placenames Database of Ireland, this means "the gorge". Under the Official Languages Act 2003, only the Irish name of Creeslough electoral division has official status, because part of it is in the Gaeltacht, whereas Creeslough village is outside the Gaeltacht and its English name has equal status.  is usually interpreted as +; where  means "lake", while  literally means "gullet, throat" and metaphorically can mean either a gap or gluttony. In the 1830s, John O'Donovan glossed the name as "Craoslaoch [sic] swallowing lake; throat lake", and Patrick Weston Joyce glossed it in 1875 as "Craos-loch — a lake that swallows up everything". In 2000, Lawrence Donegan wrote:
Craos Loch in Irish, meaning Throat Lake or Gullet Lake. Why? Because there was a tiny lake at the top of the village that gathered a lot of rainwater from the surrounding hills and leaked only a little away through a tiny stream. Where did all the water go? It had been swallowed by the hungry lake, obviously. Why not call the village Hungry Lake? It wasn't poetic enough.

History

Evidence of ancient settlement in the area include a number of ringfort, holy well, enclosure and burial sites in the townlands of Creeslough, Killoughcarran and Masiness. Nearby Doe Castle, a tower house with a surrounding bawn, dates from the 1420s.

On 7 October 2022, an explosion at Creeslough destroyed a shop and Applegreen petrol station, as well as the adjoining apartment block, resulting in ten deaths and multiple injuries.

Places of interest

Nearby places of interest include: 
Doe Castle, a 15th-century castle of the MacSuibhne clan, restored between 2002 and 2005.  It is perhaps best known as the place to which Owen Roe O'Neill returned to command the Irish Confederate's Ulster army in 1642 during the Irish Confederate Wars.
Ards Forest Park, which contains some megalithic tombs, ringforts and a Mass rock. The forest park encompasses a variety of habitats, including sand dunes, tidal salt marsh as well as several small lakes, two of which are vegetation-filled and in the process of becoming bogs.
Owencarrow Viaduct, the scene of a 1925 rail disaster.
Glenveagh National Park, created in 1981 from lands granted by Henry P. McIlhenny, of Philadelphia. 
Muckish, a mountain with distinctive outline and a number of routes to the summit, a common hiking destination. The surrounding mountainous areas are also suitable for hiking. The annual Glover Highlander walk goes from Muckish to Errigal. There are also several marked trails in Glenveagh National Park.
Doe Chapel (1784–1971); the remains of its outer walls are situated within the current graveyard at Doe (in Cashelmore, 3 km north of Creeslough). The bell tower stands intact.
 St. Michael's Catholic Church, known locally as 'the Chapel', designed by Derry architect Liam McCormick in 1971. Notable for its unique design, which mimics the shape of the nearby table mountain of Muckish. McCormick was also responsible for the design of the RIAI Triennial Gold Medal-winning St Aengus' Church in Burt, County Donegal. The chapel bell was moved from the bell tower at Doe Chapel.

Transport
Creeslough railway station opened on 9 March 1903, closed for passenger traffic on 3 June 1940, and finally closed altogether on 6 January 1947.

Education

The area around Creeslough is served by three primary schools:
 Scoil Mhuire – Roman Catholic, 142 pupils (2011 figures)
 Creeslough National School – Church of Ireland, 20 pupils (2011 figures)
 Glassan National School – Roman Catholic, 29 pupils (2011 figures), located 5 km to the west of Creeslough village

People
Kathleen Antonelli, programmer of ENIAC, the first ever computer
Thomas Bartholomew Curran, barrister and Anti-Parnellite
Lawrence Donegan, Scottish journalist and musician, author of No News at Throat Lake (2000). Donegan lived in Creeslough for a short time.
Bridie Gallagher, singer described as "Ireland's first truly international pop star"
Bernard Lafferty, butler and heir to Doris Duke
Neil McBride (Niall Mac Gioll Bhridé), poet, author, and lyricist
Martin McElhinney, Gaelic footballer
Colm McFadden, Gaelic footballer 
James McNulty, activist for Irish Independence and father of Kathleen Antonelli
Christy Toye, Gaelic footballer

In popular culture
 No News at Throat Lake is a memoir by Lawrence Donegan about his year living in Creeslough as a reporter for the bi-weekly newspaper, Tirconaill Tribune.
 The area has featured in a number of Irish folk songs, including "Cutting the Corn in Creeslough" which has been covered by Daniel O'Donnell and Creeslough native Bridie Gallagher.

See also
 List of towns and villages in the Republic of Ireland

References

External links

Creeslough News

Towns and villages in County Donegal